Morton County is a county in the U.S. state of North Dakota. As of the 2020 census, the population was 33,291, making it the seventh-most populous county in North Dakota. Its county seat is Mandan.
Morton County is included in the Bismarck, ND, Metropolitan Statistical Area.

Early History
The county was created on January 8, 1873, by the Dakota Territory legislature, using territory that had not previously been included in any county. The county organization was not completed at that time, but the new county was not attached to any other county for administrative or judicial matters. Its organization was completed on November 5, 1878. It was named for Oliver Hazard Perry Throck Morton (1823-1877), governor of Indiana during the American Civil War and later a United States Senator. Portions of the county were partitioned off on February 10, 1879, causing the county organization to be not fully organized. This lasted until February 28, 1881, when the organization was again completed. The county's boundaries were adjusted in 1881 and in 1887. In 1916, a portion of Morton County was partitioned off to create Grant County, setting Morton County's boundaries to their present configuration.

After the Northern Pacific Railroad announced the location for the western approach to its Missouri River bridge, a new settlement appeared in December 1878. Initially the US Post Office designated the riverside settlement "Morton" after the corresponding county. The Morton post office later moved to the city center 3 miles west. The county was reorganized in 1881 after the detached land was returned to Morton County by the 1881 legislature. The town, eventually renamed Mandan, was named the county seat.

Recent History
Further information: Curlew Township

DAPL protests
The 1,172-mile long Dakota Access Pipeline (DAPL) route submitted in its final permit applications starting in September 2014 would include a 72-mile portion through Morton County. The county became a focus of DAPL protests in April 2016. In August 2016 the Standing Rock Sioux Tribe (SRST) filed an injunction against United States Army Corps of Engineers (USACE) to attempt to halt construction. In his 58-page decision by United States District Judge James E. Boasberg shows that the tribe failed to participate in the process of the USACE and Energy Transfer Partners (ETP) to address the tribes complaints. Furthermore, the tribe did not cite a fear of water contamination in the injunction. The injunction request was denied and also failed on appeal. Amnesty International wrote a letter to Sheriff Kyle Kirchmeier on September 28, 2016, requesting that he investigate the use of force by private contractors, remove blockades and discontinue the use of riot gear by Morton County sheriff's deputies when policing protests in order to facilitate the right to peaceful protests in accordance with international law and standards. This letter was written in response to private security guards using guard dogs on advancing protesters on September 3, along with using pepper spray. On November 20, North Dakota police officers fired rubber bullets, tear gas, CS canisters and water from fire hoses at rioting protesters in subfreezing temperatures.

Geography
The Missouri River flows south-southeastward along the east boundary line of Morton County, and Cannonball River flows east-northeastward along the eastern portion of the county's south boundary line. The county terrain consists of low rolling hills, etched by gullies and drainages; the more level areas are devoted to agriculture. The terrain generally slopes to the east and south, but also slopes into the river valleys, with the high point near the midpoint of the north boundary line, at  ASL.

Major highways

  Interstate 94
  North Dakota Highway 6
  North Dakota Highway 21
  North Dakota Highway 25
  North Dakota Highway 31
  North Dakota Highway 49
  North Dakota Highway 1806

Adjacent counties

 Oliver County - north
 Burleigh County - northeast
 Emmons County - east
 Sioux County - southeast
 Grant County - south
 Stark County - west
 Mercer County - northwest

Protected areas

 Lake Patricia National Wildlife Refuge
 Morton County State Game Management Area
 Storm Creek State Game Management Area
 Sweet Briar Dam State Game Management Area

Lakes

 Crown Butte Lake
 Fish Creek Lake
 Harmon Lake
 Lake Oahe (part)
 Lake Patricia
 Storm Creek Lake
 Sweet Briar Lake

Demographics

2000 census
As of the 2000 census, there were 25,303 people, 9,889 households, and 6,932 families in the county. The racial makeup of the county was 95.82% White, 0.16% Black or African American, 2.39% Native American, 0.30% Asian, 0.01% Pacific Islander, 0.16% from other races, and 1.16% from two or more races. 0.65% of the population were Hispanic or Latino of any race. 64.5% were of German and 10.6% Norwegian ancestry.

There were 9,889 households, out of which 34.90% had children under the age of 18 living with them, 58.20% were married couples living together, 8.50% had a female householder with no husband present, and 29.90% were non-families. 25.70% of all households were made up of individuals, and 10.90% had someone living alone who was 65 years of age or older. The average household size was 2.51 and the average family size was 3.03.

The county population contained 27.00% under the age of 18, 7.80% from 18 to 24, 28.20% from 25 to 44, 22.40% from 45 to 64, and 14.60% who were 65 years of age or older. The median age was 37 years. For every 100 females there were 99.30 males. For every 100 females age 18 and over, there were 96.30 males.

The median income for a household in the county was $37,028, and the median income for a family was $44,592. Males had a median income of $30,698 versus $21,301 for females. The per capita income for the county was $17,202. About 6.80% of families and 9.60% of the population were below the poverty line, including 11.00% of those under age 18 and 14.30% of those age 65 or over.

2010 census
As of the 2010 census, there were 27,471 people, 11,289 households, and 7,523 families in the county. The racial makeup of the county was 93.6% white, 3.6% American Indian, 0.4% black or African American, 0.2% Asian, 0.1% Pacific islander, 0.4% from other races, and 1.6% from two or more races. Those of Hispanic or Latino origin made up 1.5% of the population. In terms of ancestry,

Of the 11,289 households, 30.9% had children under the age of 18 living with them, 53.1% were married couples living together, 9.3% had a female householder with no husband present, 33.4% were non-families, and 27.7% of all households were made up of individuals. The average household size was 2.38 and the average family size was 2.90. The median age was 39.3 years.

The median income for a household in the county was $50,591 and the median income for a family was $62,713. Males had a median income of $42,044 versus $31,505 for females. The per capita income for the county was $25,303. About 5.4% of families and 8.2% of the population were below the poverty line, including 10.8% of those under age 18 and 9.6% of those age 65 or over.

Communities

Cities

 Almont
 Flasher
 Glen Ullin
 Hebron
 Mandan (county seat)
 New Salem

Census-designated place
 Harmon

Unincorporated communities

 Bluegrass
 Breien
 Eagle Nest
 Fallon
 Fort Rice
 Huff
 Judson
 Rock Haven
 St. Anthony
 Sims
 Solen
 Sweet Briar
 Timmer
 Youngstown

Township
 Captain's Landing

Politics
Morton County voters have been reliably Republican for decades. In only one national election since 1964 has the county selected the Democratic Party candidate.

See also
 National Register of Historic Places listings in Morton County, North Dakota

References

External links

 Morton County official website
 Morton County maps, Sheet 1 (northeast), Sheet 2 (southeast), and Sheet 3 (western), North Dakota DOT

 
Bismarck–Mandan
North Dakota counties on the Missouri River
1878 establishments in Dakota Territory
Populated places established in 1878